The Camp Van Dorn Slaughter refers to a conspiracy theory popularized in a 1998 self-published book, more than two-thirds acknowledged fiction, that alleged some 1200 members of the all-black 364th Infantry Regiment were killed in June 1943 by white soldiers at Camp Van Dorn, a U.S. Army installation near Centreville, Mississippi.  As no hard evidence has been found to support these allegations, despite a more than year long investigation by the Department of Defense, most observers have dismissed this claim.

The book consists of two sections: Part One has 54 pages of purported history, and Part Two has 200+ pages, described by Case as a fictionalized account of the alleged events.

Background
The US Army's 364th Infantry Regiment was one of numerous all-black regiments in the segregated army of World War II. It had been formed in 1942 from other units in Louisiana and included numerous soldiers from northern states, who bristled at the Jim Crow laws and segregation in the South. That year it was assigned to Camp Florence near Phoenix, Arizona to serve as guards for the German prisoners of war held there. The civilian society was highly segregated, and blacks made up about 7% of the population in the city. They and other minorities: Hispanics, Native Americans and Asians were restricted in their daily lives and rights.

An estimated 100 soldiers of this all-African-American unit were involved in a racial incident in Phoenix known as The Thanksgiving Day Riot. In a melee that erupted in the black neighborhood of the city, where many of the 364th soldiers had gone to the bars, an expanding group reacted to a shooting and detention of some members by black MPs from Camp Florence, and came back to the area armed themselves. As the confrontation spread, other soldiers were assigned to the areas, and local civilian law enforcement entered the battle.  

Civilians came under attack after the MPs together with other law enforcement blockaded a 28-block square area to capture soldiers who had fled into the civilian areas. In total, three people were documented as killed: an officer, an enlisted man, and a civilian, and twelve enlisted men were injured. There have been persistent claims that more civilians were killed in events that included attacks on the black neighborhood in south Phoenix in an effort to round up the soldiers. 

While in Phoenix, members of the 364th were involved in other disruptive events.

Camp Van Dorn

In 1942 the 364th was transferred to Camp Van Dorn, near Centerville, Mississippi, located in Wilkinson and Amite counties in the southwest part of the state, near the Louisiana border. This rural area along the Mississippi River was still largely devoted to cotton plantations, with the black majority of civilians dominated by whites. Centerville had only 1200 residents. The total of black and white troops at Camp Van Dorn nearby totaled nearly 30,000 men; most were white. There were about 3,000 men in the 364th Regiment and another 3,653 black troops at the camp.    

One soldier, Private William Walker, was fatally shot by a local sheriff assisting military police at the front gate of the camp in 1943. He was returning to base from rest and recuperation.  

Following these incidents, the soldiers participated in the Louisiana Maneuvers. Most of the 364th Regiment was stationed in 1943 in the Aleutian Islands in Alaska, where the Japanese had been repelled the year before. Some 300 members of the regiment were reassigned to other units in the US.

Self-published book alleging massacre of black soldiers
Carroll Case, a loan officer, writer and artist in McComb, Mississippi, conducted an  investigation and self-published a book in 1998 alleging that some 1200 members of the all-black 364th Regiment were killed by whites in a riot at Camp Van Dorn on an unspecified date in 1943.  His book is called The Slaughter: An American Atrocity. Published in August 1998, initially it attracted little notice.

Part one is short and presents some limited historical documentation. Most of the book consists of Part Two, Case's admittedly fictional account, entitled "The Evangeline File", based on his allegations about Camp Van Dorn.  

The Washington Post noted that, in his book "Case has no clear explanation of why the shootings took place, no firm date for the event nor the names of any of the other participants or victims. Although Case presents accounts from at least two other local residents who claim to have witnessed the killings, in 15 years he has never encountered a member of the 364th or any of the other 30,000 soldiers at the camp at the time who remember the alleged atrocity." Case relied on a dramatic account of a white man about the alleged massacre. The Army service record shows that he was not stationed at the camp at the time. He had died by the time the book was published. 

When publicity broke about the book after Case appeared on a BET show discussing it, the National Minority Military Museum Foundation, based in Oakland, California, conducted an investigation into the allegations. The organization has supported research and publicity about black military history since 1978. Spokesman Charles Blatcher said the foundation concluded that Case’s claim is “not sufficiently supported by historical documentation.”

At the request of Representative Bennie Thompson (D-Mississippi) and the NAACP, the Department of Defense conducted a more than year-long investigation of the 364th Regiment and the alleged events. They concluded Case's allegations were without merit, and said in December 1999 that no hard evidence of the alleged massacre had been found. William E. Leftwich III, deputy assistant secretary of defense for equal opportunity, said the book was a "work of fiction and a marketing grab." The Army report, entitled A Historical Analysis of the 364th Infantry in World War II, was released December 23, 1999. It noted that "All of the nearly 4000 men who were assigned to the 364th in 1943 have been traced to their separation from military service."  

Kwesi Mfume, president of the NAACP, asked for another federal investigation, to be conducted by Attorney General Janet Reno and the Justice Department.

The Washington Post published an extensive account of the failures of Case to support his allegations. It reviewed the research and tracking of personnel of the unit by the Department of Defense.

In popular culture
 The History Channel broadcast a documentary entitled Mystery of the 364th (May 20, 2001), produced by Greg DeHart.

This documentary is referred to by Ray Stern of the Phoenix New Times in 2020, who said, "But good conspiracy theories don't die if there's money to be made. In 2001, the History Channel aired a segment still enjoyed by conspiracy theorists about the 364th and the alleged killings."

References

Further reading 
 Carroll Case, The Slaughter: An American Atrocity (1998), First Biltmore Corporation,  (self-published)

Buffalo Soldiers
Conspiracy theories in the United States
Conspiracy theories involving race and ethnicity
Death conspiracy theories
Pseudohistory